Viridistria striatovirens is a moth of the family Noctuidae first described by Frederic Moore in 1883. It is found in India.

References

External links
Images at Flickr

Pantheinae
Moths of Asia